Saint-Léger-les-Mélèzes (Vivaro-Alpine: Sant Lagier) is a commune in the Hautes-Alpes department in southeastern France.

Population

See also
Communes of the Hautes-Alpes department

References

Communes of Hautes-Alpes